Ruth Orkin (September 3, 1921 – January 16, 1985) was an American photographer, photojournalist, and filmmaker, with ties to New York City and Hollywood. Best known for her photograph An American Girl in Italy (1951), she photographed many celebrities and personalities including Lauren Bacall, Doris Day, Ava Gardner, Tennessee Williams, Marlon Brando, and Alfred Hitchcock.

Life

Ruth Orkin was born on September 3, 1921 in Boston, Massachusetts to Mary Ruby and Samuel Orkin. Ruth grew up in Hollywood, due to her mother's career as a silent film actress. In 1931, she received her first camera, a 39-cent Univex, and soon began experimenting by taking photographs of her friends and teachers at school. At the age of 17, she decided to bike across America, beginning in Los Angeles, and ending in New York City for the 1939 World's Fair. She completed the trip in three weeks' time, taking photographs along the way.

She briefly attended Los Angeles City College for photojournalism in 1940, prior to becoming the first messenger girl at MGM Studios in 1941, citing a desire to become a cinematographer. She left the position after discovering the union's discriminatory practices that did not allow female members. She joined the Women's Auxiliary Army Corps during World War II, in 1941 in an attempt to gain filmmaking skills, as advertisements promoting the group promised. The attempt was not fruitful, however, and she was discharged in 1943 without any filmmaking training.

In 1943, Orkin moved to New York City in pursuit of a career as a freelance photojournalist. She began working as a nightclub photographer, and received her first assignment in 1945 from The New York Times to shoot Leonard Bernstein. Shortly after, her freelance career grew as she traveled internationally on assignments and contributed photographs to Life, Look, Ladies' Home Journal, and others. Orkin is credited with breaking into a heavily male field.

Orkin's most celebrated image is An American Girl in Italy (1951). The subject of the now-iconic photograph was the 23-year-old Ninalee Craig (known at that time as Jinx Allen). The photograph was part of a series originally titled "Don't Be Afraid to Travel Alone."  The image depicted Craig as a young woman confidently walking past a group of ogling Italian men in Florence. In recent articles written about the pair, Craig claims that the image was not staged, and was one of many taken throughout the day, aiming to show the fun of traveling alone.In 1952 Orkin married photographer, filmmaker and fellow Photo League member Morris Engel. Orkin and Engel collaborated on two major independent feature films, "Little Fugitive" (1953) and "Lovers and Lollipops" (1955). After the success of the two films, Orkin returned to photography, taking color shots of Central Park as seen through her apartment window. The resulting photographs were collected in two books, "A World Through My Window" (1978) and "More Pictures from My Window" (1983).

Orkin taught photography at the School of Visual Arts in the late 1970s, and at the International Center of Photography in 1980. After a long, private battle with cancer, Orkin died of the disease at her New York City apartment on January 16, 1985.

Awards

Photography 
 3rd Prize Winner, LIFE Magazine's Young Photographer's Contest, 1951
 One of Top Ten Women Photographers in the U.S., Professional Photographers of America, 1959
 1st Annual Manhattan Cultural Award, Photography, 1980

Other 
 Certificate of Merit, Municipal Art Society of New York, 1984

Bibliography, filmography

Books
The World Through My Window, Harper and Row, 1978
A Photo Journal: Ruth Orkin, The Viking Press, 1981
More Pictures from My Window, Rizzoli, 1983

Films
The Little Fugitive, 1953
Editor, Co-director and Co-writer
Academy Award Nomination, Best Original Screenplay
Silver Lion, Venice Film Festival
Lovers and Lollipops, 1955
Editor, Co-producer, Co-director and Co-writer
The film served as inspiration for Carol (film), according to Director Todd Haynes

References

External links
 www.orkinphoto.com
 www.okinphotostore.com- Official Store
The Ruth Orkin Photograph Collection at the New York Historical Society
Orkin's photographs at MPTV Images.

20th-century American photographers
1921 births
1985 deaths
American women film directors
American film directors
American film producers
American women screenwriters
20th-century American women writers
20th-century American businesspeople
Deaths from cancer in New York (state)
American women film producers
American women film editors
American film editors
20th-century American screenwriters
20th-century American women photographers
20th-century American businesswomen
Photographers from Massachusetts